Mădălina Ion (born 23 February 1996) is a Romanian handball player who plays for Universitatea Cluj-Napoca.

Achievements 
Cupa României:
Winner: 2019 

Liga Națională:
Silver Medalist: 2019 

Supercupa României:
Finalist: 2018 

Supercupa României:
Finalist: 2018 
IHF Junior World Championship:
Bronze Medalist: 2016  
IHF Youth World Championship:
Gold Medalist: 2014

References
  

   
1996 births
Living people
Sportspeople from Bucharest
Romanian female handball players